Telmányi is a Hungarian surname. Notable people with the surname include: 

Anne Marie Telmányi (1893–1983), Danish painter and writer
Emil Telmányi (1892–1988), Hungarian violinist

Hungarian-language surnames